Waldameer & Water World is an amusement park and water park in Erie, Pennsylvania located at the base of Presque Isle. Waldameer is the fourth oldest amusement park in Pennsylvania, the tenth oldest in the nation, and one of only thirteen trolley parks still operating in the United States. The park is admission-free, with a midway, and covered picnic facilities. The roller coasters and other major rides require either the display of a paid wristband scanned upon riding, or the use of "Wally Points" on their "Wally Card" system. A gift shop is located in the park selling Waldameer souvenirs. The water park operates an assortment of water slides and raft rides and is admission by fee only. The name "Waldameer" can be translated literally as "Woods by the Sea" in German. Waldameer's operating season runs from May through September.

History 
The park began as a picnic area called Hoffman's Grove. The Erie Electric Motor Company leased the park in 1896 and renamed it "Waldameer." The trolley car company extended service to its new park, making Hoffman's Grove picnic area a terminus on the line in the hopes of increasing passenger traffic.

The park operates two classic dark attractions: the Whacky Shack (built in 1970), a two-story ride, and the Pirates Cove (built in 1972), a walk-through funhouse. Both were designed and built by dark ride specialist Bill Tracy and his company, Amusement Display Associates of Cape May, New Jersey.

Waldameer sold its classic carousel at auction in 1988 for more than $1 million. A new carousel with sixty operating horses was obtained from Chance Manufacturing. The park owner intended to construct a new restaurant called The Carousel next to the Rainbow Gardens banquet hall, though this idea never came to fruition. A 10-foot giraffe and a jumping horse from the classic carousel were reserved from the auction to be used in the new restaurant. Part of the auction proceeds was used to erect four additional water slides—a speed slide, free fall slide, one-man and two-man raft sides—all built by Molded Fiberglass Company of Union City.

For the 2007 season, Waldameer opened X-Scream, a 140-foot-tall drop tower ride. In 2008, the highly anticipated Ravine Flyer II wooden coaster opened, leading to 20% increase in attendance, and the busiest season in park history. The coaster won the Golden Ticket Award for the best new ride for 2008. The 2009 season saw the extension of the midway south to coincide with the addition of a new Disk-O ride, Mega Vortex. A modern, "cashless" pay system called a Wally Card was introduced for 2010. A new family-oriented area, The North End, located within the train turnaround, opened in 2011. The rides located in the area are the Flying Swings, S.S. Wally, and Wendy's Tea Party. New additions for the 2012 season included the Zamperla-manufactured Happy Swing (located in the Kiddieland area), a second train for the L. Ruth Express, a redesigned loading area for the Whacky Shack, and the requirement that all in-park transactions must be made with a Wally Card. For the 2014 season, Waldameer painted the slides in Water World, as well as added new decorative items throughout the park. In 2015, Waldameer began a waterpark expansion with the opening of the largest wave pool in the tri-state area. The 2016 season saw the addition of slides and a splash pad for younger children known as Kidz Zone. A water playground, dubbed Battle of Lake Erie, was introduced for the 2017 season. New additions for the 2018 season included a bowl slide from ProSlide Technology, called CannonBOWL, and a Zamperla Samba Balloon Ride, named Balloon Race. In 2019, the park unveiled Chaos, a Zamperla Discovery pendulum ride called the Chaos. For the 2020 season, the park added a compact spinning coaster from Italian manufacturer SBF Visa and named it Whirlwind. It is located adjacent to Ali Baba and was the park's first new coaster since Ravine Flyer II in 2008.

Awards
In 2008, Ravine Flyer II was named "Best New Ride" by Amusement Today and was ranked #11. That same year, Paul Nelson was named "Person of the Year" by Amusement Today.

In addition, Waldameer’s two Bill Tracy dark rides, Whacky Shack and Pirate's Cove, have won numerous dark ride awards from DAFE.org. Both attractions have consistently ranked in the top 10 for their respective categories (Classic Dark Ride and Walkthrough).

Current rides

Roller coasters

Thrill rides

Family rides

Dark attractions

Kiddie rides

Water attractions

Water World 

Water World is a water park located in Waldameer Park. Established in 1986, and completed in 1992, Water World contains 11 major slides, an Endless River, Heated Relaxing Pool, and several kids' zones. In June 2015, Waldameer opened a wave pool that can accommodate 1,000 people.

Slides and attractions 
 Awesome Twosome - Enclosed two-man raft
 Bermuda Triangle - Three enclosed body slides
 CannonBOWL - Toilet bowl-style tube slide (Proslide Technology)
 Endless River - Lazy river
 Giant Wave Pool - Wave pool
 Heated Relaxing Pool - Hot tub
 Lake Erie Dip - Open-air body slide
 Liquid Lightning - Enclosed two-man raft
 Presque Isle Plunge - Open-air body slide
 Raging River - Large open-flume raft slide
 Rally Racer - Six lane slide
 RocketBLAST - Water coaster slide
 Wild River - Open-air one-man raft slide

Kid Zones
 Battle of Lake Erie - 8 slides, multiple sprinklers, and multiple floors, inspired by the famous Battle of Lake Erie
Kidz Zone - 8 slides and multiple sprinklers

Past rides and attractions

Past rides 

 Bumper Boats (1984–1999)
 Figure Eight
 Flying Coaster/The Bump
 Free-fall Slide (1989–2019)
 Hand-carved Carousel
 Kiddie Bumper Boats (1984–1998)
 Mini E (1983–2013)
 Old Mill/Mill Run (1920s–1995)

 Ravine Flyer (1922–1938)
 Speed Slide (1989–2019)
 Whip

Past attractions 

 Bavarian Hoffbrau
 Boardwalk

 Monkey Island
 Tad Pool (1986–2015)
 Showtime Theater (Unknown–2019)

Incidents at Waldameer Park

Ravine Flyer 
During the late evening hours of August 8, 1938, the Ravine Flyer failed to clear the hill following the bridge crossing Peninsula Drive. As the train continued to travel back and forth over Peninsula Drive, a woman became hysterical. Her brother then rose out of his seat in an attempt to calm her. He lost his balance, which resulted in the fall to his death in the middle of Peninsula Drive. The Ravine Flyer was shut down for further investigation, which revealed no direct cause of the accident. However, the roller coaster was demolished as the owner's wife was devastated by the event. The Ravine Flyer was finally replaced 70 years later in 2008 by the Ravine Flyer II in which Peninsula Drive was spanned again.

Chaos 
On June 28, 2019, the Chaos ride was going through its usual cycle. At around 1:30 p.m., the ride became stuck upside-down for about two minutes. There were no injuries reported during this incident. The ride was closed for the rest of the day and reopened the following day with the upside-down feature removed. On July 3, the cause of the malfunction was stated to be because of loose wires. The ride was opened to its full ride cycle on July 4 without further issues.

References

External links 
 Waldameer's website
 
 The Bill Tracy Project

1896 establishments in Pennsylvania
Amusement parks in Pennsylvania
Parks in Erie, Pennsylvania
Water parks in Pennsylvania
Tourist attractions in Erie, Pennsylvania
Buildings and structures in Erie, Pennsylvania